The Connecticut Probate Court system is a system of 54 individual probate courts located throughout the state of Connecticut. The jurisdiction of each court extends to the legal affairs of the deceased, estates, some aspects of family law, conservatorship, and several other matters requiring specific legal decisions. As statutory courts, all jurisdiction and authority is governed by the state legislature.

Elections of judges
Judges of probate are the only members of the state judicial branch elected in Connecticut. Judges are elected in partisan elections and hold office for a term of four years, their elections held within the same cycle as gubernatorial elections.

Prior to 2011, state law permitted anyone to run as a candidate for judge of probate regardless of previous judicial or legal experience. However, a state law which went into effect on January 5, 2011 now requires candidates for judge of probate to be both a lawyer and a member of the Connecticut bar.

Consolidation of court districts
After operating without much change since 1850, growing financial difficulties in the state and within the probate courts created the need for the system to be overhauled. In the summer of 2009, the Probate Court Redistricting Commission assembled to review the aging court system and make recommendations for decreasing the number of judicial districts from 117. In September 2009, the commission announced its consolidation plan to reduce the number of districts to 54 for the 2010 elections.

Probate districts
The currently elected judges of probate, elected from January 2011 through January 2015:

† Judge Kepple was elected in an August 16, 2011, special election to fill the unexpired term of Fred Palm, who died in March 2011.

‡ Judge Lassman Fisher was elected in an August 21, 2012, special election to fill the unexpired term of Brian Griffin, who died in February 2012.

‡ Judge Maxham was elected in a November 6, 2018, general election to succeed Daniel F. Caruso, who died in February 2018.

See also
Courts of Connecticut

References

External links
Connecticut Probate Court website
Connecticut Probate Court entry on Judgepedia

Connecticut state courts
Connecticut law
Inheritance
Probate courts in the United States
Courts and tribunals with year of establishment missing